Hasborn-Dautweiler is a part of the municipality Tholey in the district of Sankt Wendel in the northern Saarland, Germany. Until the end of 1973 Hasborn-Dautweiler was an independent municipality.

History 
In connection with the territory and administrative reform in the Saarland in 1974, on January 1, 1974, the thus far independent municipality Hasborn-Dautweiler was associated to the newly created municipality of Tholey

References 

Former municipalities in Saarland